Dennisiopsis is a genus of fungi in the Thelebolaceae family.

The genus name of Dennisiopsis is in honour of Richard William George Dennis (1910 - 2003), British botanist (mycology) and plant pathologist.

The genus was circumscribed by Chirayathumadom Venkatachalier Subramanian and K.V. Chandrashekara in  Kew Bull. Vol.31 (Issue 3) on page 639 in 1977.

References

External links
Index Fungorum

Leotiomycetes